Daniel Blumberg is an English artist, musician, songwriter and composer from London who works between drawing, improvisation, song form and film.

Music career

From 2005 to 2009, Blumberg was a founding member and lead singer for the band Cajun Dance Party. From 2009-2013, Blumberg was frontman and guitarist for the indie rock band Yuck.

'Unreal' by Hebronix, produced by Neil Michael Hagerty, was released by ATP Recordings in 2013. This was followed by a split single with Neil Michael Hagerty, released under the name Heb-Hex 
Since 2013, Blumberg has worked mostly around Cafe Oto utilising Oto Project Space and working regularly with Seymour Wright, Billy Steiger, Tom Wheatley, Ute Kanngiesser, Ross Lambert and Elvin Brandhi.

His shows are sometimes completely improvised or incorporate improvisation within his songs. He most frequently plays Steinberger guitar, piano, harmonica and sings. Blumberg collaborates with many different musicians live changing from show to show.

He explained to Il Manifesto in a 2019 interview "Live music must be live. I can't say what will happen from one concert to another. Sound with different formations and combinations. Now I'm in a trio with Billy and Tom. The space and context are always different and for this reason the music we produce is never the same."

On 17 December 2019 he performed with a motorbike in a duo with Tom Wheatley for ICA’s Pere Portabella retrospective.

Mute Records released Blumberg's debut solo album, Minus, in May 2018. Minus was recorded by Scott Walker’s producer Peter Walsh with a group of radical musicians whom Blumberg met at Cafe Oto including Billy Steiger (violin), Tom Wheatley (double bass), Ute Kanngiesser (cello) and Terry Day (vocals). Jim White played drums on the album. Minus received extremely positive reviews: The Times gave it 5 out of 5 and hailed it as a ‘modern classic’, while Billboard described it as "one of the more unique and exquisite records you're likely to hear this year." Amongst other critical praise for the album, Rough Trade ranked it the sixth best album of 2018.

On 11 April 2018, Cafe Oto's OtoRoku released a live album, recorded on 28 February with Billy Steiger, Tom Wheatley and Ute Kanngiesser. It was mixed by Marta Salogni, amongst others.

On 5 June 2018, Blumberg, Steiger and Wheatley performed two tracks from Minus, "The Bomb" and "Minus", on Later... with Jools Holland.

"Liv" was released by Mute Records in December 2018. It was originally recorded live at Sarm Studios, London in 2014 and features Kohhei Matsuda on monosynth, Billy Steiger on violin and Tom Wheatley on double bass. Blumberg performed in various configurations across Europe in support of the album including Hamburg Elbphilharmonie alongside Arto Lindsay, plus international festivals including Katowice Ars Cameralis, The Hague Crossing Border, Milan Triennale and End of the Road Festival.

In March 2020, he performed a live stream concert at Café Oto as part of a fundraiser for the venue which incorporated extended sections of live drawing as well as live versions of his songs. The concert was reviewed in a half-page piece written by Abi Bliss in The Wire the following month.

"On&On", his second album on Mute Records was released on 31 July 2020. It featured the same core group of players as "Minus", with the addition of Elvin Brandhi performing vocoded vocals on the track "Silence Breaker", and Peter Walsh returned to production duties. Initial reviews were overwhelmingly positive with The Financial Times giving it 5* and describing it as 'a startlingly good album', The Independent called it 'an extraordinary work' in a 4* review, and Uncut hailed 'another superb LP' and gave it 8/10. Pitchfork scored it 7.6 and contended that 'Blumberg uses improvisation and repetition to break free from traditional modes of songwriting'.

Musical collaborations
Blumberg performs with saxophonist Seymour Wright as GUO. Their first release, GUO1, was self-released in 2016, with a text from David Toop. In 2017, GUO2 was released by Cafe Oto's label Oto Roku, and included text from American filmmaker Brady Corbet.

GUO4 was released on Mute Records on 20 September 2019, featuring text from Fran Edgerley of Turner Prize-winning collective Assemble and a short film by Peter Strickland.

BAHK, Blumberg’s ongoing collaboration with Elvin Brandhi (of the duo Yeah You) has encompassed sporadic concerts, residencies and collaborative music, drawing and film. The group released their first track on the Qu Junktions compilation ‘Hope You’re Well’ in May 2020. The pair also devised a video work and silverpoint drawings for Blumberg’s series Silver Dinner which was broadcast via Homecooking in June 2020 in which Blumberg collaborated with Japanese musician Keiji Haino. In December 2021 BAHK premiered a 15 minute film work via AQNB called 'Alternatives for a Future Society beyond Head Infected Bodies'.

Film
In 2018 Curzon Cinemas/British Film Institute (BFI) commissioned Blumberg to compose the music to launch their Agnès Varda film season 'Gleaning Truths'. which was announced in July 2018 and went on to tour the UK.

In 2019, GUO collaborated with British director Peter Strickland who created a short film entitled GUO4, to coincide with the release of the record on Mute which premiered at 76th Venice International Film Festival in August 2019. It debuted in the UK at the 63rd BFI London Film Festival in October 2019.

In October 2019, GUO collaborated with American film director Brady Corbet on a short film and performance entitled "GYUTO" which premiered at London’s Close-Up Film Centre.

In July 2020 it was announced that Mona Fastvold's film 'The World To Come' - starring Vanessa Kirby, Katherine Waterson, Casey Affleck and Christopher Abbott - would premiere in competition at the 77th Venice Film Festival, for which Blumberg composed the original score. Avant-garde musicians including Peter Brötzmann, Josephine Foster and Steve Noble feature on the score, which is produced by Peter Walsh. Following the premiere, The Observer described Blumberg's work as 'superbly original'. Indiewire voted it their Number 1 film score of 2021, writing that "in no film this year was a score more crucial to the flow and texture of a story... Blumberg's first movie score so beautifully crystallizes the ache of first love by listening for the stir of echoes that it leaves behind".

Mute release the score on limited edition vinyl and CD on 14 January 2022, featuring two extended solo improvisations by Peter Brötzmann as physical edition exclusives.

In May 2022 he won an Ivor Novello Award for Best Original Film Score for The World To Come, his first Ivor Novello Award.

Visual art
Blumberg is a visual artist working primarily in the medium of drawing. He creates figurative drawings with the ancient technique of Silverpoint, also using watercolour and graphite. In 2015 he was awarded a scholarship to study a diploma in traditional drawing techniques at London's Royal Drawing School.

In 2019, he participated in the Hyper! Exhibition at Deichtorhallen, Hamburg in which he showed a large-scale graphite drawing. Also on display were 10 of his miniature watercolours and 2 video works. Hans Urlich Obrist wrote in the Hyper! exhibition catalogue that "Daniel Blumberg moves very delicately between the two worlds - between music and art."

He presented his first solo show "UN-ERASE-ABLE" in 2019 at Union Gallery in London displaying a selection of his Silverpoint miniatures which he calls ‘micrograms’.

In 2020 he continued his work with silverpoint in a short work made for JOMO, a series by the MACRO Museum of Contemporary Art. in Rome and a series of drawings made for MK Gallery, Milton Keynes  He also exhibited in digital media at Homecooking for whom he created a series called SILVER DINNER combining drawing with music, performance and video in collaboration with Keiji Haino and Elvin Brandhi.

He composed the music for Marianna Simnett’s video piece "Dance, Stanley Dance" which premiered at Matts Gallery, London in May 2020.

From 20 June 2020 to 10 January 2021, Blumberg will show a large graphite drawing at the Kunsthal in Rotterdam for the exhibition 'Black Album, White Cube' alongside artists including Albert Oehlen, Scott King and Mark Leckey.

Early life
From 2005 until 2008, Blumberg was frontman for Cajun Dance Party The band signed to XL Recordings whilst he was still at school and he left shortly after releasing their debut album.

In 2008 Blumberg recorded an album in Nashville with Mark Nevers, William Tyler and Tony Crow (Lambchop) called Daniel In The Lions Den,  released by Yoshimoto Jap/Zoom in Japan in 2009

From 2009-2012, Blumberg was frontman and guitarist for the indie rock band Yuck, with whom he released their debut album before leaving the band. During this period he self-released solo cassettes of dictaphone recordings of his piano songs under the names Yu(c)k, and Oupa. and toured and recorded material with Low Blumberg made chapbooks of his drawings including the David Berman titled ‘Somatic Archaeology’

Unreal by Hebronix, produced by Neil Michael Hagerty, was released by ATP Recordings in 2013. This was followed by a split single with Neil Michael Hagerty, released under the name Heb-Hex.

Blumberg was an occasional member of Neil Hagerty’s The Howling Hex, playing guitar and vocals at Primavera Festival, Counterflows Festival in Glasgow and Café Oto London.

References

1990 births
Living people
Mute Records artists
English male composers
English male musicians
English songwriters
21st-century English male artists
British male songwriters